Malcolm de Chazal (12 September 1902 – 1 October 1981) was a Mauritian writer, painter, and visionary, known especially for his Sens-Plastique, a work consisting of several thousand aphorisms and pensées.

Early life and education
Chazal was born in Vacoas of a French family long established in Mauritius and wrote all his works in French. Except for six years at Louisiana State University, where he received an engineering degree, he spent most of his time in Mauritius where he worked as an agronomist on sugar plantations and later for the Office of Telecommunications.

Writing
In 1940 he began to publish in Mauritius a series of volumes consisting of hundreds of numbered thoughts and ideas entitled Pensées. In 1945, a seventh volume of Pensées, bound with another collection of unnumbered aphorisms entitled Sens-Plastique appeared, and two years later a separate Sens-Plastique, Volume II, appeared. It was this latter volume on which the Gallimard edition of 1948 was based that brought Chazal into prominence in France. He was hailed as a surrealist by André Breton and ex Journalist Adeenarain M Tatiah.  The following examples may illustrate the novelty and variety of Sens-Plastique.

{{quote|
Half-opened petals give the flower an adenoidal look.

We know the halls of the eye like welcome visitors but we live in our mouth.

Any man who acts singly in the press of a mob will get trampled. Shifting into reverse while making love can kill you.

Immediately before it falls, water turns into a living being as if a person's soul had just slipped into it: look at the way it bends and twists, writhing in desperation. (What if you threw a not quite cold corpse out of an airplane—would the dead awaken?...)}}

In the prefaces and afterwords of the various editions of Sens-Plastique Chazal explained his method of thinking and writing as follows:

Chazal's other writings include notably La Vie Filtrée (1949), a collection of essays that elaborate the ideas found in Sens-Plastique, Sens Magique (1957) and Poèmes (1968 ), gnomic verses that dramatize the experiences described in Sens-Plastique, and Petrusmok (1951), the spiritual history of Mauritius found in its natural surroundings.Sens-Plastique has been translated into English by Irving Weiss in a volume published by Green Integer (2008) as Sens-Plastique.Works
 1940 : Pensées I, The General Printing & Stationery Cy Ltd 
 1942 : Pensées II, The General Printing & Stationery Cy Ltd 
 1942 : Pensées III, The General Printing & Stationery Cy Ltd 
 1943 : Pensées IV, The General Printing & Stationery Cy Ltd 
 1944 : Pensées V, The General Printing & Stationery Cy Ltd 
 1944 : Pensées VI, The General Printing & Stationery Cy Ltd (Pensées I à VII reprinted: Exils, 1999) 
 1945 : Pensées et Sens-Plastique, The General Printing & Stationery Cy Ltd 
 1945 : Pensées VII, The General Printing & Stationery Cy Ltd 
 1946 : Histoire de la pensée universelle, The General Printing & Stationery Cy Ltd 
 1947 : Sens-plastique II, The General Printing & Stationery Cy Ltd, Gallimard, repr.. 1948, 1985
 1949 : La Vie filtrée,  Gallimard
 1950 : Iésou,  The Almadinah Printing Press, théâtre
 1950 : L'Âme de la musique, The Mauritius Printing Cy Ltd 
 1950 : La Pierre philosophale, The Almadinah Printing Press 
 1950 : Penser par étapes, P.A. Bettencourt, in Réalités secrètes 1961 
 1951 : Petrusmok, The Standard Printing Est., 1951, La Table Ovale, 1979 
 1951 : Mythologie du Crève-Cœur, The Almadinah Printing Press, 1951 
 1951 : Le Rocher de Sisyphe, The Mauritius Printing Cy Ltd, 1951, Patrice Thierry-L’Ether Vague, 1996 
 1951 : Aggenèse I, The Almadinah Printing Press 
 1951 : La Clef du cosmos, The Mauritius Printing Cy Ltd, 1951, Patrice Thierry — L’Ether Vague, 1994 
 1951 : Manifeste, Aggenèse II, Révélation de la nuit, The Almadinah Printing Press, 1951 
 1952 : Le Livre de conscience, The Almadinah Printing Press, 1952, Arma Artis, 1985
 1952 : La Grande révélation, The Almadinah Printing Press 
 1952 : La Science immortelle, The Almadinah Printing Press 
 1952 : Le Roi du monde, The Almadinah Printing Press 
 1952 : Le Pape et la science et la révélation de l’angélisme, The Almadinah Printing Press 
 1952 : Le Livre d’or, The Almadinah Printing Press 
 1952 : La Bible du mal, The Almadinah Printing Press 
 1952 : L'Évangile de l’eau, The Almadinah Printing Press 
 1952 : La Fin du monde, The Almadinah Printing Press  
 1952 : Le Livre des principes, The Almadinah Printing Press 
 1952 : Message aux Français, in Synthèse 
 1953 : Judas, Esclapon 
 1953 : Judas ou la trahison du prêtre, Popular Printing 
 1953 : L’Absolu, The Almadinah Printing Press 
 1953 : Pentateuque, The Almadinah Printing Press 
 1953 : Préambule à l’absolu, The Almadinah Printing Press 
 1954 : Les Deux infinis, The Almadinah Printing Press 
 1954 : L’Espace ou Satan, The Standard Printing Est. 
 1954 : Les Dieux ou les consciences-univers, Esclapon Ltd 
 1954 : Les Désamorantes, suivi de Le Concile des poètes, The Mauritius Printing Cy Ltd ;
 1954 : Le Sens de l’absolu, The Almadinah Printing Press 
 1957 : Sens-Magique, The Almadinah Printing Press, 1957, 1958, Lachenal et Ritter, 1983 
 1958 : Sens-Magique, 2ème édition, Tananarive 
 1958 : Apparadoxes, The Almadinah Printing Press 
 1968 : Poèmes, Jean-Jacques Pauvert 
 1973 : L'Île Maurice proto-historique…, Guillemette de Spéville 
 1974 : L’Homme et la connaissance, Jean-Jacques Pauvert 
 1974 : Sens unique, 1974, L’Ether Vague, 1985 
 1976 : La Bouche ne s’endort jamais, Saint-Germain-des-Prés, 1976, Patrice Thierry — L’Ether Vague, 1994

Painting
Chazal took up painting in the 1950s at the suggestion of Georges Braque. Unlike the speculative aphoristic character of his best-known writings, his  paintings concentrated on natural forms and landscapes in a primitive, emblematic style.

References

 Malcolm, le tailleur des visions''.  Documentary film, dir. Khal Torabully.

References

1902 births
1981 deaths
20th-century Mauritian writers
People from Moka District
Mauritian artists